Richard Grady (born 28 April 1955) is a Canadian former ski jumper who competed in the 1976 Winter Olympics.

References

1955 births
Living people
Canadian male ski jumpers
Olympic ski jumpers of Canada
Ski jumpers at the 1976 Winter Olympics
Place of birth missing (living people)